The City of London School for Girls (CLSG) is a private school in the Barbican in the City of London. It is the partner school of the all-boys City of London School and the City of London Freemen's School. All three schools receive funding from the City's Cash. It is a member of the Headmasters' and Headmistresses' Conference (HMC) and the Girls' Schools Association.

History
The school was founded using a bequest by William Ward, a merchant of Brixton, in 1881 and opened in Carmelite Street in 1894. It was his conviction that girls should be given a broad and liberal education with an emphasis on scholarship; he left a third of his fortune to the City of London to fund the foundation of a girls' school. The school is still administered by the Corporation of London, and the Board of Governors is appointed by the Court of Common Council. The school also receives financial support from the City Livery Companies as well as banks and other City firms. The school has strong links with the all-boys City of London School, 15 minutes' walk away, which likewise is run by the Corporation.

The school moved to new buildings in the Barbican Estate in 1969.

General 

The school has an excellent academic reputation. In 2018, it was rated by The Sunday Times as the second-best independent school in the UK, based on GCSE and A-Level results. It has previously topped The Times A-level league table of England's independent schools and its table of prep schools. It has contributed two female participants to UK International Mathematical Olympiad teams.

The Good Schools Guide describes City as having a "famously diverse mix of pupils and staff as befits the school's situation in the heart of the city". The school has a small prep school taking pupils from the age of 7, although most students join at 11. The school admits some students at 16. The secondary school's capacity is roughly 680 pupils.

Fees are currently £6,404 per term for the senior school exclusive of school lunches, and entrance is by examination. Approximately 25% of students receive bursary assistance of some kind, including full bursaries.

The school is secular, yet has mildly Christian traditions, with an optional annual Carol Service in the neighbouring St Giles' Church. There is a Jewish Society as well as an Asian Society, an Oriental Society and an African-Caribbean Society.

City has a house system which consists of four houses. The four houses are Fleet (after Fleet Street), Tudor (after Tudor Street), St. Bride (after St. Bride church on Fleet Street), Ward (after William Ward, the founder of the school). There are a variety of inter-house competitions, including Drama, Debating, Maths, Art, Music, the Inter-House Quiz and at Sports Day, as well as several other sports competitions throughout the year.

There have been 12 headmistresses of the school;  the headmistress is Jenny Brown.

Extracurricular 
The school is adjacent to the Barbican Arts Centre and the Guildhall School of Music and Drama, and has a strong focus on the arts. The school offers joint music scholarships with the Guildhall Music School. Since 2005, the school has held a drama festival called Moat Fest.

The school has a swimming pool, a lecture theatre, two netball/tennis courts, a drama studio, an all weather playing field and an indoor gym with climbing wall, as well as a gym complete with exercise equipment such as treadmills and weights. The school has several times won the national European Youth Parliament competition and has a strong debating program.

The school offers language exchanges to France, Spain, Germany and China, as well as other travelling opportunities through schemes such as World Challenge, which has seen girls go recently to Venezuela. Duke of Edinburgh Award expeditions have been confined to the UK since 2001 when student Amelia Ward was killed whilst abseiling on a Duke of Edinburgh trip in South Africa.They regularly have exchanges from countries such as Australia, China, Germany, France, and Spain.

It is the only school to have won the international Kids' Lit Quiz twice, in 2010 and 2014.

Buildings 
The school is situated in a Grade II listed building in the Barbican.

The school has attracted controversy with recent expansion plans. In January 2018 plans were advanced to expand prep school for four- to seven-year-olds in an underground car park of an adjoining tower block, Thomas More House. The plans met with significant local opposition. A further plan for expansion was prepared by Nicholas Hare Architects, again meeting with strong opposition, and was subsequently abandoned.

Head Mistresses 
1894–1910 Alice Blagrave
1910–1927 Ethel Strudwick
1927–1932 Hilda Doris Bugby (died in office)
1932–1937 Julia Elizabeth Turner
1937–1949 E. D. M. Winters
1949–1972 Gladys Colton (1909–1986)
1972–1986: Lily M. Mackie
1986–1995: Lady Valerie France
1995-2007: Yvonne Burne 
2007–2014: Diana Vernon
2014–2019: Ena Harrop
2019–present: Jenny Brown

Notable former pupils
For a fuller list, see Category:People educated at the City of London School for Girls
Wilhelmina Hay Abbott, suffragist
Dido Armstrong, singer
 Anna Blundy, journalist
 Margaret Boden, scientist
Fiona Caldicott, psychiatrist and psychotherapist, Principal of Somerville College, Oxford
 Hilary Cass, President of the Royal College of Paediatrics and Child Health
 Daisy Christodoulou, educationalist
Jean Dawnay, fashion model
 Elizabeth Emanuel, fashion designer
 Romola Garai, actress
Grace Golden, artist
 Florence Harmer, historian
Sarah B Hart, mathematician, first female Gresham Professor of Geometry
 Sahar Hashemi, entrepreneur
Tin-Tin Ho, table tennis player
Phyllis Margaret Tookey Kerridge, scientist
 Hermione Lee, professor of English at the University of Oxford, President of Wolfson College, Oxford
 Megan Lloyd George, politician
 Tasmin Lucia Khan, ITV news presenter
 Georgina Mace DBE FRS, Conservation scientist
 Sara Nathan, journalist
 Mary Nighy, actress
 Melinda Camber Porter, artist, journalist, & filmmaker
 Ella Purnell, actress
 Claire Rayner, journalist
 Dinah Rose, barrister, President of Magdalen College, Oxford
 Dorothy Spiers, first female actuary in the UK
Margaret Stacey, sociologist
 Olivia Sudjic, novelist
 Margaret Turner-Warwick, first female president of the Royal College of Physicians 
 Alison Weir, historian, writer
 Claudia Winkleman, television presenter
 Sophie Winkleman, actress

References

External links 

 The school's official site
 2003 Report on the school from the independent schools Inspectorate.
League Table results from BBC News.
 Preparatory department profile on Times Online
 Profile at the Good Schools Guide
 School profile at the Schools Guidebook

Private girls' schools in London
Private schools in the City of London
Educational institutions established in 1894
Member schools of the Girls' Schools Association
Kids' Lit Quiz winners
Barbican Estate
1894 establishments in England
Member schools of the Headmasters' and Headmistresses' Conference